This is a list of products made by Mamiya, including cameras and lenses.  Models made by Mamiya but marketed under other labels are shown in parentheses.

Cameras

16 mm format

 Mamiya 16 (1949)
 Mamiya Super 16 (1953)
 Mamiya Super 16 II (1957)
 Mamiya Super 16 III (Tower 16) (1958)
 Mamiya 16 Automatic (Revue 16 Automatic) (1959)
 Mamiya 16 Deluxe (1961)
 Mamiya 16 EE Deluxe (1962)

126 format
 (Argus 260 Automatic) (1964)
 (Keystone K1020) (1966) — fixed-lens single lens reflex

35 mm format

Rangefinder
 Mamiya 35 I (1949)
 Mamiya 35 II (1955)
 Mamiya 35 III (1957)
 Mamiya Magazine 35 (1957)
 Mamiya Wide (1957)
 Mamiya Elca (1958)
 Mamiya Crown (1958)
 Mamiya Metra (1958)
 Mamiya S (1958)
 Mamiya Wide E (1959)
 Mamiya Auto Metra (1959)
 Mamiya Metra 2 (1959)
 Mamiya Auto Metra 2 (1959)
 Mamiya Sketch (1959) — square image format (24mm × 24mm)
 Mamiya S2 (1959)
 Mamiya Ruby (1959)
 Mamiya Auto Deluxe (1960)
 Mamiya Ruby Standard (1961)
 Mamiya M3 (1961)
 Mamiya EE Super Merit (Mamiya Vulcan, Honeywell Electric Eye 35R, Mansfield Eye-Tronic R) (1962)
 Mamiya 4B (Rank Mamiya) (1963)
 Mamiya Super Deluxe (1964)
 Mamiya Myrapid (1965) — half-frame
 Mamiya 135 (1977)

Single lens reflex

 Mamiya Prismflex (c. 1952) — prototype
 Mamiya Pentaflex (c. 1955) — prototype
 Mamiya Prismat (1960) — Exakta bayonet mount
 Mamiya Prismat NP (Sears 32A, Tower 32B, Sears 32B) (1961) — Exakta bayonet mount
 Mamiya Prismat PH (Tower 37, Tower 37A, PCA V-90) (1961) — Exakta bayonet mount
 Mamiya Prismat WP (1962) Argus Bayonet mount 
 Mamiya Prismat WT (1962) Argus Bayonet mount
 (Nikkorex F, Ricoh Singlex, Nikkor J) (1962) — Nikon F-mount
 Mamiya Prismat CPH (1963) — Exakta bayonet mount
 Mamiya Prismat CWP (Mamiya Prismat CP) (1964) — Exakta bayonet mount
 Mamiya/Sekor 500TL (1966) — M42 lens mount
 Mamiya/Sekor 1000TL (1966) — M42 lens mount
 Mamiya/Sekor 500DTL (1968) — M42 lens mount
 Mamiya/Sekor 1000DTL (1968) — M42 lens mount
 Mamiya/Sekor 2000DTL (1969) — M42 lens mount
 Mamiya/Sekor AutoXTL (1972) — Mamiya XTL bayonet mount
 Mamiya X-1000 (1974) — Mamiya XTL bayonet mount
 Mamiya MSX 500 (1974) — M42 lens mount
 Mamiya MSX 1000 (1975) — M42 lens mount
 Mamiya DSX 500 (1975) — M42 lens mount
 Mamiya DSX 1000 B (1975) — M42 lens mount
 Mamiya NC-1000 (1978) — Mamiya NC bayonet mount
 Mamiya NC-1000s (1978) — Mamiya NC bayonet mount
 Mamiya ZE (1980) — Mamiya Z bayonet mount
 Mamiya ZE-2 (1980) — Mamiya Z bayonet mount
 Mamiya ZE-X (1981) — Mamiya Z bayonet mount
 Mamiya ZM (1982) — Mamiya Z bayonet mount
 Mamiya ZF (c. 1983) — prototype

Fixed-lens SLR
 Mamiya Auto-Lux 35 (1961)
 Mamiya Prismat Family (1962)
 Mamiya Prismat 528TL (1967)
 Mamiya Prismat 528AL (1975)

Viewfinder

 Mamiya Mammy (1953) — zone focus system
 Mamiya Speed Shot Special (a.k.a. Mamiya Pistol Camera) (c. 1954) — half-frame; rare police model; not sold to public
 Mamiya Automatic 35 EEF (Tower 39, Tower 41) (1961) — zone focus system
 Mamiya EE Merit (Honeywell Electric Eye) (1962) — zone focus system
 Mamiya 135 EF (1979) — zone focus system
 Mamiya 135 AF (1980) — auto-focus
 Mamiya U (1981) — zone focus system
 Mamiya 135 EF2 (1982) — zone focus system
 Mamiya M (1982) — auto-focus
 Mamiya U Auto Focus (1983) — auto-focus
 Mamiya M Time Memory  (1983) — auto-focus

6×4.5 cm format
For details, see Mamiya 645.

Mamiya 645 manual focus series
The M645 (discontinued) was manufactured from 1975 to 1987 — the first model and the launch of the Mamiya 645 system
The M645 1000S (discontinued) was manufactured from 1976 to 1990 — added a 1/1000 second shutter speed, self-timer and a depth-of-field preview lever
The M645J (discontinued) was manufactured from 1979 to 1982 — a stripped down version of the M645
The Mamiya 645 Super (discontinued) was manufactured from 1985 to 1993 — a new camera design with removable film backs
The Mamiya 645 Pro (discontinued) was manufactured from 1993 to 1998 — minor updates to the Mamiya 645 Super
The Mamiya 645 Pro-TL (discontinued) was first released in 1997 — minor updates to the Mamiya 645 Pro
The Mamiya 645E (discontinued) was first released in 2000 — entry-level model with a non-interchangeable back and finder

Mamiya 645 auto focus series
 Mamiya 645AF (1999) — the first autofocus model
 Mamiya 645AFD (2001) — added communication interface for digital backs
 Mamiya 645AFD II (2005) — minor updates to the 645AFD
 Mamiya 645AFD III (Phase One 645AF) (2008) — minor updates to the 645AFD II
 Mamiya 645DF (Phase One 645DF) (2009) — digital-only (no film backs) supports Leaf shutter lenses, vertical grip and user firmware upgrades.
 Mamiya 645DF+ (Phase One 645DF+) (2012-current) — Faster auto focus compared to DF and automated live view handling with compatible digital backs.

Mamiya ZD series
 Mamiya ZD (2004) — fixed-back medium-format DSLR

6×6 cm format

Twin-lens reflex

 Mamiyaflex Junior (1948)
 Mamiyaflex Automat A (1949)
 Mamiyaflex I (1951)
 Mamiyaflex II (1952)
 Mamiyaflex Automat B (1954)
 Mamiyaflex Automat A II (1955)
 Mamiyaflex Automat B II (1956)
 Mamiyaflex Automat A III (1956)
 Mamiyaflex C Professional (1956)
 Mamiyaflex PF (1957) police model
 Mamiyaflex C2 Professional (1958)
 Mamiya C3 Professional (1962)
 Mamiya C33 Professional (1965)
 Mamiya C22 Professional (1966)
 Mamiya C220 Professional (1968)
 Mamiya C330 Professional (1969)
 Mamiya C330f Professional (1975)
 Mamiya C220f Professional (1982)
 Mamiya C330s Professional (1983)

Rangefinder
 Mamiya Six I (1940)
 Mamiya Six I A (1941)
 Mamiya Six III (1942)
 Mamiya Six II (1943)
 Mamiya Six II A (1943)
 Mamiya-6 IV (1947)
 Mamiya-6 V (1953)
 Mamiya-6 K (1954)
 Mamiya-6 IV B (1955)
 Mamiya-6 Automat (1955)
 Mamiya-6 K II (1956)
 Mamiya-6 IV S (1957)
 Mamiya-6 P (1957)
 Mamiya-6 Automat 2 (1958)
 Mamiya 6 (1989) — electronic 6 cm × 6  rangefinder camera
 Mamiya 6 MF (1993) — added multi-format back feature

6×7 cm format

 Mamiya RB67 Professional (1970) — mechanical 6 cm × 7 cm SLR medium-format camera
 Mamiya RB67 Professional S (1974) — minor changes
 Mamiya RB67 Professional GL (1982) — special edition of the Pro-S
 Mamiya RB67 Professional SD (1990) — new, larger lens throat; older lenses require an adapter
 Mamiya RZ67 Professional (1982) — electronic 6 cm × 7 cm SLR medium-format camera
 Mamiya RZ67 Professional II (1995) — upgraded electronics
 Mamiya RZ67 Professional IID (2004-2014) — added communication interface for digital backs
 Mamiya 7 (1995–1999) — electronic 6 cm × 7 cm rangefinder camera
 Mamiya 7 II (1999-2011) — added multi-exposure capability and other minor improvements

6x9 cm format

 Mamiya Press (1960)
 Mamiya Press G (1963)
 Mamiya Press S (1964)
 Mamiya Press Standard (1965)
 Mamiya Press Super 23 (1967)
 Mamiya Universal Press (1969)
 (Polaroid 600/600SE) — similar to the Mamiya Universal, but with different lens and back mounts (note: not part of the 600 series consumer line)

Lenses

Mamiya 645 lenses and accessories

See the Mamiya 645 system article for a complete list of lenses and accessories

Mamiya RB lenses 
Mamiya RB lenses come in original (single-coated), C (multi-coated), K/L (newer design multi-coated), L (newer design multi-coated, Pro-SD body only), and APO/L (low-dispersion glass, Pro-SD body only) versions.

 Mamiya 37 mm f/4.5 C Fisheye
 Mamiya 50 mm f/4.5
 Mamiya 50 mm f/4.5 C (current)
 Mamiya 65 mm f/4.5
 Mamiya 65 mm f/4.5 C
 Mamiya 65 mm f/4.0 K/L (current)
 Mamiya 75 mm f/4.5 K/L (current)
 Mamiya 75 mm f/3.5 S/L Shift
 Mamiya 90 mm f/3.8
 Mamiya 90 mm f/3.8 C
 Mamiya 90 mm f/3.5 K/L (current)
 Mamiya 127 mm f/3.8
 Mamiya 127 mm f/3.8 C
 Mamiya 127 mm f/3.5 K/L (current)
 Mamiya 140 mm f/4.6 C Macro (current)
 Mamiya 150 mm f/4.0 C Variable Soft Focus (current)
 Mamiya 150 mm f/3.5 K/L
 Mamiya 180 mm f/4.5
 Mamiya 180 mm f/4.5 C
 Mamiya 180 mm f/4.5 K/L (current)
 Mamiya 210 mm f/4.5 APO/L (current)
 Mamiya 250 mm f/4.5
 Mamiya 250 mm f/4.5 C
 Mamiya 250 mm f/4.5 K/L (current)
 Mamiya 250 mm f/4.5 APO/L (current)
 Mamiya 350 mm f/5.6 APO/L (current)
 Mamiya 360 mm f/6.3
 Mamiya 360 mm f/6.3 C
 Mamiya 360 mm f/6.3 K/L
 Mamiya 500 mm f/8.0 C
 Mamiya 500 mm f/6.0 APO/L
 Mamiya 100–200 mm f/5.2 C Zoom (current)
 Mamiya No. 1 extension tube (45mm) (Pro/Pro-s and Pro-SD versions)
 Mamiya No. 2 extension tube (82mm) (Pro/Pro-s and Pro-SD versions)

Mamiya RZ lenses
Mamiya RZ lenses feature Seiko #1 electronic shutters.

 Mamiya 37 mm f/4.5 Fisheye  (current)
 Mamiya 50 mm f/4.5
 Mamiya 50 mm f/4.5 ULD L (current)
 Mamiya 65 mm f/4.0
 Mamiya 65 mm f/4.0 L-A(current)
 Mamiya 75 mm f/3.5 L
 Mamiya 75 mm f/4.5 L Short Barrel
 Mamiya 75 mm f/4.5 Shift (current)
 Mamiya 90 mm f/3.5 (current)
 Mamiya 110 mm f/2.8 
 Mamiya 110 mm f/2.8 W (current)
 Mamiya 127 mm f/3.8
 Mamiya 127 mm f/3.5
 Mamiya 140 mm f/4.5 Macro
 Mamiya 140 mm f/4.5 L-A Macro (current)
 Mamiya 150 mm f/3.5 (current)
 Mamiya 180 mm f/4.0 D/L Variable Soft Focus (current)
 Mamiya 180 mm f/4.5 Short Barrel (current)
 Mamiya 180 mm f/4.5 W-N (current)
 Mamiya 210 mm f/4.5 APO (current)
 Mamiya 250 mm f/4.5 (current)
 Mamiya 250 mm f/4.5 APO (current)
 Mamiya 350 mm f/5.6 APO (current)
 Mamiya 360 mm f/6.0
 Mamiya 500 mm f/8.0
 Mamiya 500 mm f/6.0 APO
 Mamiya 100–200 mm f/5.2 Zoom (current)

Mamiya 6 lenses
 Mamiya 50 mm f/4
 Mamiya 75 mm f/3.5
 Mamiya 150 mm f/4.5

Mamiya 7 lenses
 Mamiya 43 mm f/4.5 (current)
 Mamiya 50 mm f/4.5 (current)
 Mamiya 65 mm f/4.0 (current)
 Mamiya 80 mm f/4.0 (current)
 Mamiya 150 mm f/4.5 (current)
 Mamiya 210 mm f/8.0 (current)

Mamiya-Sekor E and EF lenses

 Mamiya-Sekor E 1:2.8 f=28mm
 Mamiya-Sekor E 1:3.5 f=28mm
 Mamiya-Sekor E 1:2.8 f=35mm
 Mamiya-Sekor E 1:1.4 f=50mm
 Mamiya-Sekor E 1:1.7 f=50mm
 Mamiya-Sekor E 1:2 f=50mm
 Mamiya-Sekor E 1:3.5 f=50mm Macro
 Mamiya-Sekor E 1:2.8 f=135mm
 Mamiya-Sekor E 1:3.5 f=135mm
 Mamiya-Sekor E 1:4 f=200mm
 Mamiya-Sekor E 1:4 f=300mm
 Mamiya-Sekor Zoom E 1:3.5-4.5 f=28-50mm  
 Mamiya-Sekor Zoom E 1:3.5-4.5 f=35-70mm 
 Mamiya-Sekor Zoom E 1:3.5-4.3 f=35-105mm 
 Mamiya-Sekor Zoom E 1:3.8 f=70-150mm 
 Mamiya-Sekor Zoom E 1:3.8 f=80-200mm
 Mamiya-Sekor Zoom E 1:4 f=80-200mm
 Mamiya-Sekor EF 1:2.8 f=35mm
 Mamiya-Sekor EF 1:1.4 f=50mm
 Mamiya-Sekor EF 1:1.7 f=50mm
 Mamiya-Sekor E 1:2.8 f=135mm

Auto Mamiya-Sekor CS lenses

 Auto Mamiya-Sekor CS 1:3.5 f=14mm Fisheye
 Auto Mamiya-Sekor CS 1:2.8 f=21mm
 Auto Mamiya-Sekor CS 1:2.8 f=28mm
 Auto Mamiya-Sekor CS 1:2.8 f=35mm
 Auto Mamiya-Sekor CS 1:1.4 f=50mm
 Auto Mamiya-Sekor CS 1:1.7 f=50mm
 Auto Mamiya-Sekor CS 1:2 f=50mm
 Auto Mamiya-Sekor CS 1:3.5 f=50mm Macro
 Auto Mamiya-Sekor CS 1:2.8 f=135mm
 Auto Mamiya-Sekor CS 1:3.5 f=200mm
 Auto Mamiya-Sekor CS 1:4 f=300mm
 Auto Mamiya-Sekor Zoom CS 1:3.5 f=45-90mm
 Auto Mamiya-Sekor Zoom CS 1:3.8 f=80-200mm

Mamiya/Sekor M42 lenses

M42 list from 
 AUTO mamiya/sekor  1:2.8  f=28 mm
 AUTO mamiya/sekor  1:2.8  f=28 mm
 AUTO mamiya/sekor  1:2.8  f=28 mm
 AUTO mamiya/sekor  1:2  f=50 mm  Model I  (DTL Series)
 AUTO mamiya/sekor  1:2  f=50 mm  Model II  (DTL Series)
 AUTO mamiya/sekor  1:2.8  f=50 mm
 AUTO mamiya/sekor 55 mm 1:1.4
 AUTO mamiya/sekor  1:1.8  f=55 mm
 mamiya-sekor  1:1.7  f=58 mm
 mamiya macro sekor  1:2.8  f=60 mm
 AUTO mamiya/sekor  1:2.8  f=135 mm  (TL Series)
 AUTO mamiya/sekor  1:2.8  f=135 mm  (DTL Series)
 AUTO mamiya/sekor  1:3.5  f=200 mm  Model III
 mamiya/sekor  1:6.3  f=400 mm

The mamiya/sekor 55mm 1:1.4 is known to have radioactive thorium glass elements.

Accessories

Flash units
 Mamiyalite ZE
 Mamiyalite MZ 36R
 Mamiya Auto 480
 Mamiya Auto 480 Model 2

Digital camera backs
 Mamiya ZD Back — compatible with 645AFDII, 645AFDIII and through HX701 adapter RZ67 Pro IID
 Mamiya DM22 — bundled with a 645DF
 Mamiya DM28 — bundled with a 645DF
 Mamiya DM33 — bundled with a 645DF

Gallery

Further reading
 Mamiya Leaf products
 Mamiya Camera Museum - in Japanese

References

 http://www.csse.monash.edu.au/~carlo/Mamiya-Samples.html

External links
 Mamiya page at Camera-wiki.org
 R.Herron's Collecting Mamiya 35 mm (Collector site for Mamiya 35mm)
 Karen Nakamura's Mamiya RB67 Pro Site

Mamiya products